Joe Camel (also called Old Joe) was an advertising mascot used by the R. J. Reynolds Tobacco Company (RJR) for their cigarette brand Camel. The character was created in 1974 for a French advertising campaign, and was redesigned for the American market in 1988. He appeared in magazine advertisements, clothing, and billboards among other print media and merchandise.

In 1991, the Journal of the American Medical Association (JAMA) published research claiming that the Joe Camel ad campaign was appealing to children. They found that Joe Camel and the Disney Channel logo were recognized equally among six-year-olds, high school students were more familiar with him than adults, and claimed that Camel's market share among youth smokers had risen from less than 1% to 33%. The research led RJR to a lawsuit in California, and a formal complaint from the Federal Trade Commission (FTC) for "unfair practices" by exposing children to the dangers of smoking. RJR denied claims that they were marketing towards children, but voluntarily ended the campaign in 1997 after increased litigation and pressure from American federal agencies.

Description 
Joe Camel is an anthropomorphic camel who smokes cigarettes. He lacks many typical camelid traits such as a hump, hooves, or tail, essentially appearing as a muscular humanoid with a camel's head. Some critics claimed Joe's nose was intentionally drawn in a phallic fashion, as to suggest that smoking is a virile pursuit. This claim was dismissed by its designer.

Although television advertisements for cigarettes were outlawed in the United States, Joe Camel could often be seen on billboards, magazines, clothing, and other promotional displays. Early advertisements would often depict Joe alongside the motto "Smooth character." RJR also ran promotions in which customers could redeem "Camel Cash" vouchers for Joe Camel gear including clothing, watches, mugs, lighters, and shower curtains.

History

Origins 

Camel cigarettes, a brand owned by R. J. Reynolds (RJR), were first released in 1913 featuring a plain camel drawing on the package. The character Joe Camel was created in 1974 by British artist Nicholas Price for a French advertising campaign for Camel cigarettes. The character was based on "Old Joe", the original camel drawing. The new Joe Camel character was subsequently used in advertising in other countries throughout the 1970s.

Joe Camel was first seen in the United States in 1988 when Greensboro, North Carolina company Trone Advertising used the French character in promotional materials created for the Camel brand's 75th anniversary. However, the American version of Joe Camel was created later by art designer Mike Salisbury working on contract for the brand's main agency, McCann-Erickson New York. In a 1996 interview, Salisbury claimed the intent of the campaign was compete with Marlboro and its successful Marlboro Man campaign. According to Salisbury, there was never any intent to attract children. Salisbury claimed that RJR would reject some designs on the grounds they would appeal too much to children, and that there was a conscious effort to make him look like a 30-year old. McCann requested Salisbury to base the character on masculine heroes in old action and adventure films. Early versions of the character as a fighter pilot or private detective were not successful, but the character found success with a look inspired by James Bond and James "Sonny" Crockett. The success of the campaign made the character a key part of Camel's advertising.

JAMA studies and Mangini lawsuit

In December 1991, the Journal of the American Medical Association (JAMA) published a study in which young children were asked to match brand logos with products. The study showed that among children age six, 91.3% matched Joe Camel with cigarettes, nearly the same amount who matched the Disney Channel logo with Mickey Mouse. The researchers claimed that RJR (at the time operating as RJR Nabisco) was just as effective at reaching children as the Disney Channel. In the same JAMA volume, another study was published comparing how well Joe Camel was recognized among high school students versus adults over age 21. The study concluded that high school students were more likely to recognize Joe Camel (97.7% vs 72.2%), understand the product being advertised (97.5% vs. 67%), and identity the Camel brand (93.6% vs 57.7%). The study concluded that the Joe Camel campaign was far more successful at advertising to children than adults. The authors also claimed that Camel's share of smokers under 18 had risen from 0.5% to 32.8% during the campaign's three years at that point.

In response to the studies, the American Heart Association, American Lung Association, and American Cancer Society wrote a joint letter to the Federal Trade Commission (FTC) asking them to force RJR to end the Joe Camel campaign. In 1992, San Francisco-based attorney Janet Mangini brought a lawsuit against RJR challenging the company for targeting minors with the campaign. In her complaint, Mangini alleged that Camel sales to teenagers increased from $6 million to $476 million over the four years since the campaign began. However, much of Mangini's prosecution was based on the review of RJR internal documents to assess company intent rather than reviewing market data. RJR attempted to dismiss the lawsuit, claiming only the federal government could regulate its advertising, but a California state court reviewed the case, and in 1994 permitted Mangini to proceed with the lawsuit. RJR attempted to appeal to the United States Supreme Court to have the case thrown out, but their request was turned away.

FTC complaint 
The United States Congress requested the FTC to issue a complaint in 1994, but the agency determined there was not enough evidence to prove federal laws were violated. Congress wrote letters to the FTC again in 1996 and 1997, petitioning the agency the re-examine the case. In May 1997, the FTC reviewed the case and concluded that the Joe Camel campaign violated federal law as an "unfair practice" under Section 5 of the Federal Trade Commission Act, which prohibits ‘‘unfair or deceptive acts or practices in or affecting commerce.’’ The FTC issued a formal complaint, seeking an order that would bar RJR from continuing the campaign.

In the complaint, the FTC alleged that RJR was exploring ways to appeal to younger smokers and "first usual brand" smokers as early as 1984. They alleged that the purpose of the campaign was to reposition the Camel brand to young people. The complaint also stated that the campaign was successful in attracting children to smoke, and that RJR knew or should have known that Joe Camel would appeal to children. They concluded that the health injuries to children from smoking were not "reasonably avoidable" given children's inability to understand the consequences of smoking. The FTC case relied heavily on the review of RJR internal documents over market data.

End of the campaign 
RJR ended the Joe Camel campaign on July 10, 1997. The move came just weeks after the FTC complaint in May, and shortly after RJR and other tobacco companies agreed to pay a $368.5 billion settlement to states seeking to recover costs due to tobacco-related illnesses. Additionally, the tobacco industry and 40 state attorneys general had just settled on a ban on the use of cartoon figures in cigarette ads, though the settlement had yet to be ratified by Congress or seen support from President Bill Clinton.

Joe Camel was phased out of point-of-purchase advertising, followed soon by billboards and print ads. The campaign was replaced with the ''What you're looking for" campaign which used the original plain camel from the pack design. In September, RJR agreed to pay $10 million to San Francisco and the other California cities and counties who intervened in the Mangini litigation. The money was earmarked primarily to fund anti-smoking efforts targeted at youth.

Legacy 
In a retrospective analysis in 2000, economist Jack Calfee argued that the 1991 JAMA studies were inaccurate and unreliable. He wrote that much of the claims in the journal were unsubstantiated or based on flawed studies. He found that the campaign had "had little or no effect" on youth smoking rates, citing that those rates declined between 1987 and 1992. He also found that Camel's market share among youth had only moved from 4% to 12% in 1992-93, and then receded to 9%. These values were much less than the 0.5% to 32.8% claimed by the JAMA studies. He noted that the campaign marked a shift in lawmakers' assessments of cigarette advertising, away from market share data and towards review of tobacco company internal documents to determine motivation and intent.

References

External links

 Joe Camel at Don Markstein's Toonopedia. Archived from the original on October 8, 2016.
 A gallery of Joe Camel advertisements.
 Joe Chemo, an anti-smoking website based on an Adbusters character
 Internal documents produced in the Mangini vs. RJ Reynolds Tobacco Company trial

Tobacco advertising
Male characters in advertising
Fictional tobacco addicts
Camel mascots
Mascots introduced in 1987
1997 disestablishments in the United States
R. J. Reynolds Tobacco Company
American mascots
Cartoon mascots
Cartoon controversies
Advertising and marketing controversies
Fictional camelids